Big Boy Now! is a British television sitcom. It starred Leslie Crowther and Fabia Drake, and was produced by ATV. All 14 episodes of the programme were missing and believed lost, but in April 2017 three episodes—comprising the first episode of the first series and the final two episodes of the second—were discovered on 2" videotape at the BFI National Archive.

References

External links

1970s British sitcoms
1976 British television series debuts
1977 British television series endings
English-language television shows
ITV sitcoms
Lost television shows